Mehmaan is a 1973 Bollywood crime film directed by Kotayya Pratyagatma. The film stars Biswajeet and Rekha in lead roles.

Cast
Biswajeet as Rajesh
Rekha as Sheela 
Helen as Kitty 
Leela Chitnis as Rajesh's mother 
Manmohan Krishna as Manmohan / Vijay Singh 
Mukri as Bellboy 
Anwar Hussain as Anwar 
Tarun Bose as Tarun 
Joginder Shelly as Sinha 
Sulochana as Santosh

Plot
Police Inspector Rajesh's father, also a police inspector, is killed while on duty. Rajesh swears that he will continue to do his duty, and bring the assailants to justice. Out of the four assailants responsible, he is able to apprehend three of them, but the fourth one, namely Manmohan is elusive. Manmohan learns of the imprisonment of his colleagues, and arranges for them to dramatically escape from prison. Rajesh, in plain clothes, soon tracks them down in a manor run by Santosh, whose husband is none other than Manmohan. Rajesh loves Sheela, who is the niece of Santosh. Sheela has a mute sister, Meera. One day Meera is molested and the evidence points at Rajesh.

Soundtrack
All songs were composed by Ravi and penned by Sahir Ludhianvi.

"Chhod Are Jaa" - Mohd Rafi & Asha Bhosle
"Hai Uff Yeh Jawani" - Mohd Rafi
"Khule Gagan Ke Neeche" - Minoo Purushottam
"Meri Chahat Rahegi" - Mohd Rafi
"Raam Rahim" - Mahendra Kapoor, Minoo Purushottam and Deedar Singh Pardesi
"Tu Dar Maat" - Asha Bhosle

External links
 
 Mehmaan at YouTube

1973 films
1970s Hindi-language films
1973 crime films
Films scored by Ravi
Films directed by Kotayya Pratyagatma
Indian crime films
Hindi-language crime films